Thomas Cole was an English-born American artist and the founder of the Hudson River School art movement. Cole is widely regarded as the first significant American landscape painter. He was known for his romantic landscape and history paintings. Influenced by European painters, but with a strong American sensibility, he was prolific throughout his career and worked primarily with oil on canvas. His paintings are typically allegoric and often depict small figures or structures set against moody and evocative natural landscapes. They are usually escapist, framing the New World as a natural eden contrasting with the smog-filled cityscapes of Industrial Revolution-era Britain, in which he grew up. His works, often seen as conservative, criticize the contemporary trends of industrialism, urbanism, and westward expansion.

Self-taught, Cole began painting portraits in 1822. In the ensuing years, he shifted his focus to landscapes. One of Cole's first landscapes, Lake with Dead Trees (1825), was among those that first popularized his works in an 1825 exhibition. Most of his early works depict the wilderness, "the truly American forest", typically the Hudson River Valley and Catskills where he resided. From 1831 to 1832, Cole traversed Italy; some of the classical ruins he visited made appearances in his paintings, such as  Aqueduct near Rome (1832), Roman Campagna (1843), and Arch of Nero (1846). While in Rome, Cole formulated the concept for his most ambitious work yet: The Course of Empire, a series of five paintings following the rise and fall of civilization. Completed in 1836, the series reflects nostalgia for pastoralism and Cole's personal opposition to US President Andrew Jackson. His 1836 painting The Oxbow encompasses many of the themes from his earlier landscapes, juxtaposing untamed nature with "civilized" land. Later in life, Cole transitioned away from natural landscapes to focus more on works conveying religious or spiritual themes. In 1842, he painted The Voyage of Life, another allegorical series, this time depicting the course of an individual's life. His 1847 painting Prometheus Bound, based on the Greek myth, is believed by some analysts to express abolitionist sentiments. One of Cole's final landscapes, Cross at Sunset, was left unfinished after his premature death in 1848.

Today, Cole's works are held across a wide variety of major and national museums, with the Metropolitan Museum of Art, Museum of Fine Arts, Boston, and the National Gallery of Art having some of the largest collections. The following list consists only of paintings documented in public collections.

Paintings

Dated works

Undated works

Preparative works

See also
 List of paintings by Frederic Edwin Church
 List of works by Albert Bierstadt

Notes and references

Notes

References

External links
 Thomas Cole paintings at the National Gallery of Art
 Thomas Cole works at the Metropolitan Museum of Art
 Explore Thomas Cole provided by the National Park Service

 Paintings
Cole, Thomas
Hudson River School paintings
Romantic paintings